State Archaeological Museum in Kolkata, West Bengal, is an archeological museum founded in 1962 and has collections including rare tools of the Early, Middle and the Late Stone Ages from Susunia (Bankura) and other sites, proto-historic antiquities from Pandu Rajar Dhibi (Burdwan), terracottas, sculptures, stone and stucco from the Gupta, Maurya, Shunga, Kushana, Pala and Medieval times.
It is located at the vicinity of Behala Bazar Metro on Diamond Harbour Road and Nafar Chandra Das Road at Behala behind Siddeshwari Kali Temple

There is also a section on ‘Historical Art’ opened in 1963 which displays large number of old terracottas, bronzes, wood-carvings, textiles and manuscripts. Sells several card-sets and other publications; activities include explorations and excavations of historical sites.

Gallery

See also
 List of museums in India

References

Museums in Kolkata
Museums established in 1962
Archaeological museums in India